Lucknow Mahotsav, is an Indian Art & culture program organized every year in Lucknow, India to showcase Uttar Pradesh Art and Culture and in particular Lucknowavi ‘Tehzeeb’ so as to promote Tourism. One of the objectives of the cultural bonanza is to provide encouragement to the Artisans. Craftsmen from all over the country bring their masterpieces to the festival to the delight of shoppers. Colorful processions, traditional dramas, Kathak dances in the style of Lucknow Gharana, Sarangi and sitar recitals, ghazals, qawalis and thumri produce a cheerful atmosphere during the ten-day-long festival. Exciting events like ekka races, kite flying, cockfighting and other customary village games re-establish an ambience of the bygone Nawabi days.

History 
The year 1975-76 was observed and organized by Southern Asians as The Tourism Year. On this occasion it became a motive to promote Lucknow Mahotsav’s Art, Culture, and Tourism for national and international tourists. The decision to organize the Lucknow Festival was taken. During this period, with the exception of a few years, Lucknow Mahotsav has been celebrated every year. During the festival, an array of displays and events from Tonga races to Vintage automobiles reminds one of the past glories.
It was held in Begum Hazratmahal Park for most of time .

Cuisines 
Mahotsav is a delight for the connoisseurs of good food as it is the ideal place to pamper the taste buds of the visitors with endless varieties of scrumptious dishes as a wide range of cuisines are available at the festival, including Kesaria Doodh, Kabab-parathas and other mouth-watering non-vegetarian exotic dishes.

Entertainment 
The 10 days long festival is one such example. The festival invites many musical as well as comical artists for completing your day in its full sense.
The festival celebrated between 25 November and 5 December in Lucknow, the capital of Uttar Pradesh, is a cultural extravaganza. During these 10 days, the entire arena is filled with people enjoying various rides and other poetry/cultural events.

References

Festivals in Uttar Pradesh
Culture of Lucknow